Amir Jamal al-Din al-Ustadar Mosque is a historic mosque in the city of Cairo. It is located inside Islamic Cairo, facing the Al-Tambakshiya Street to the north and the Habas al-Rahb Street to the southeast.

History
The mosque was built in 1407 by and dedicated to Emir Jamal al-Din al-Ustadar, who served under the Burji Mamluk Sultan An-Nasir Faraj. The main purpose of the building is madrasa which taught all four Islamic schools of jurisprudence. It had been undergoing renovation which completed in 2001.

The architectural style of the mosque is greatly influenced by the Mosque-Madrassa of Sultan Barquq. Although Jamal al-Din was an influential patron of many of the architectures during his era, his career was tumultuous and he was not mourned after his execution by Sultan An-Nasir. At the same time, the Sultan had attempted to tear down this mosque, but it was prevented by the qadi by erasing the name of Jamal al-Din from the mosque.

Gallery

See also
  Lists of mosques 
  List of mosques in Africa
  List of mosques in Egypt
 List of Historic Monuments in Cairo

References

Bibliography
Jarrar, Sabri, András Riedlmayer, and Jeffrey B. Spurr. Resources for the Study of Islamic Architecture. Cambridge, Massachusetts: Aga Khan Program for Islamic Architecture, 1994.

Mosques completed in 1407
Mosque buildings with domes
Mosques in Cairo
Mamluk architecture in Egypt
Medieval Cairo